Belfast Duncairn was a constituency of the Parliament of Northern Ireland.

Boundaries
Belfast Duncairn was a borough constituency comprising part of northern Belfast. It was created in 1929 when the House of Commons (Method of Voting and Redistribution of Seats) Act (Northern Ireland) 1929 introduced first-past-the-post elections throughout Northern Ireland.

Belfast Duncairn was created by the division of Belfast North into four new constituencies.  It survived unchanged, returning one member of Parliament, until the Parliament of Northern Ireland was temporarily suspended in 1972, and then formally abolished in 1973.

Politics
In common with other seats in North Belfast, the seat had little nationalist presence.  It was always won by Unionist candidates, although labour movement and independent unionist candidates often contested it.

Members of Parliament

Election results

At the 1929 Northern Ireland general election, William Grant was elected unopposed.

At the 1953 Northern Ireland general election, George Boyle Hanna was elected unopposed.

At the 1958 Northern Ireland general election, William Fitzsimmons was elected unopposed.

References

Duncairn
Northern Ireland Parliament constituencies established in 1929
Northern Ireland Parliament constituencies disestablished in 1973